Mario Ferraro (born September 17, 1998) is a Canadian professional ice hockey defenceman and alternate captain for the San Jose Sharks of the National Hockey League (NHL). After one season with the Des Moines Buccaneers of the junior United States Hockey League he joined the University of Massachusetts Amherst, spending two seasons there before signing with the Sharks. Ferraro made his NHL debut with the Sharks in 2019.

Playing career
Ferraro spent the 2016–17 season with the Des Moines Buccaneers of the United States Hockey League. He scored 41 points in 60 games with the Buccaneers, tying for first among defencemen for goals and second in assists and points. As a result he was named to the USHL First-All Star Team and All-Rookie Team. After the season Ferraro was selected in the second round, 49th overall, by the San Jose Sharks at the 2017 NHL Entry Draft. He subsequently went to the University of Massachusetts Amherst, and set a team record for points by a freshman defenceman with 23 points in 39 games. He spent a second season at the university, recording 14 points in 41 games. After the conclusion of the 2018–19 season he was signed to a contract by the Sharks.

He joined the Sharks for the start of the 2019–20 NHL season and made his debut on October 2, 2019 against the Vegas Golden Knights. His first point, an assist, came in his second game on October 5, also against Vegas.

His first career NHL goal came on December 28, 2019, in a 6–1 win against the Philadelphia Flyers. He re-signed to a four-year contract with the Sharks on August 4, 2022.

Personal life
Ferraro, the son of Robert and Diana Ferraro, was born in Toronto, Ontario and grew up in King City, Ontario.

Ferraro creates tech reviews on his Youtube channel, Youngest of Plugs.

Career statistics

Regular season and playoffs

International

Awards and achievements

References

External links

1998 births
Living people
Canadian expatriate ice hockey players in the United States
Canadian ice hockey defencemen
Des Moines Buccaneers players
San Jose Sharks draft picks
San Jose Sharks players
Ice hockey people from Toronto
UMass Minutemen ice hockey players
Canadian sportspeople of Italian descent